Agylla gigas is a moth of the family Erebidae. It was described by Franciscus J. M. Heylaerts in 1891. It is found on Java.

References

Moths described in 1891
gigas
Moths of Indonesia